Igor-Saša Nikolovski (born 16 July 1973) is a retired football defender from North Macedonia.

International career
Born in Suren, France, Nikolovski made his debut for the Macedonian national team in 1995, and got 42 caps and 2 goals. His final international was a September 2002 European Championship qualification match against Liechtenstein.

References

External links
 
 
 Profile - Royal Antwerp FC Museum
Career history at Weltfussball.de

1973 births
Living people
French people of Macedonian descent
Association football central defenders
French footballers
Macedonian footballers
North Macedonia international footballers
FK Rabotnički players
FK Vardar players
Royal Antwerp F.C. players
Sakaryaspor footballers
Trabzonspor footballers
Lierse S.K. players
Macedonian First Football League players
Belgian Pro League players
Süper Lig players
Macedonian expatriate footballers
French expatriate footballers
Expatriate footballers in Belgium
Macedonian expatriate sportspeople in Belgium
Expatriate footballers in Turkey
Macedonian expatriate sportspeople in Turkey